The Men's junior road race of the 2013 UCI Road World Championships took place in Tuscany, Italy on 28 September 2013.

Qualification

Final classification (top 50)

Source

References

Men's junior road race
UCI Road World Championships – Men's junior road race
2013 in men's road cycling